Dalby Christian College is an independent, co-educational, Christian day school in Dalby, Queensland, Australia, 250 km west of Brisbane.

Founded in 1981 the school is a member of the Christian Schools Association of Australia, and currently caters for approximately 300 students from Preschool to Year 12.

The college focuses on sharing the love of Christ and is Biblically based in the framework of an Evangelical Protestant faith system.

Extra-curricular activities
Along with the formal curriculum, the school offers a range of extra-curricular options including free after-school tutoring, athletics training, debating, soccer, touch, netball and music lessons

See also
 Education in Australia
 List of schools in Queensland

References

External links
 Dalby Christian College home page
 Christian Schools Australia

Educational institutions established in 1981
Nondenominational Christian schools in Queensland
1981 establishments in Australia